Amy Griffin (born October 25, 1965) is an American soccer coach and former player. As a player, Griffin played for the United States women's national soccer team and won the 1991 FIFA Women's World Cup. She is currently the head coach of the United States deaf soccer women's national team.

Early life
Griffin grew up in Federal Way, Washington, where she attended Decatur High School and played for the club soccer team, F.C. Royals.

University of Central Florida
Griffin attended the University of Central Florida where she played goalkeeper for the Knights from 1984–1987. In 1987, she was named NCAA's Adidas Goalkeeper of the Year. Griffin and teammate Michelle Akers helped lead UCF to three NCAA Tournament appearances, including a trip to the Final Four in 1987.

Griffin was inducted into the Central Florida Hall of Fame in 1999, the school's second women's soccer honoree. The first was her teammate at UCF, Michelle Akers.

Playing career

International
Griffin played for the United States women's national soccer team from 1987–1991 and was on the squad that won the first ever FIFA Women's World Cup in 1991. In 23 career national team starts (with 24 caps), she posted a 12–8–3 record with a 0.99 goals against average.

International career statistics

Coaching career
Griffin was one of the first nine women to obtain a United States Soccer Federation (USSF) level "A" coaching license. She is active in the Olympic Development program and coached at the 1995 U.S. Olympic Sports Festival. In 1998, she became a staff coach for both the NSCAA and the U.S. Soccer Federation.

Griffin was head coach at the University of New Mexico where she started the program in 1993. The New Mexico Lobos posted a 27–24–1 record under Griffin, including a 10–7–3 mark in 1995 en route to a second-place finish in the Western Athletic Conference. Prior to that, she served as assistant coach at San Diego State University. Griffin later re-joined Lesle Gallimore, former head coach at San Diego State, at the University of Washington and has spent over a decade with the Huskies, most recently as Associate Head Coach.

Griffin was an assistant coach at Santa Clara University from 1989–1991. She was also an assistant coach at her alma mater, University of Central Florida.

In 2012, Griffin was a goalkeeper coach for the United States under-20 women's national soccer team and helped guide the team to gold at the 2012 FIFA U-20 Women's World Cup.

In 2015, Griffin was announced as the new US Deaf Women's National Team's head coach for soccer.

Today Griffin coaches with OL reign Academy in Seattle Washington

Broadcasting career
Griffin served as broadcast commentator with NBC, ESPN and Fox Network. She provided analysis for ESPN2 during the 1995 and 1999 women's soccer World Cups and was the color analyst for NBC's 2000 Sydney Olympic coverage.

Health concerns with artificial turf
Amy Griffin has played an important role by bringing forward concerns about the health of women soccer players, particularly goal keepers.  She collected data about athletes with cancer who have played on artificial turf containing "crumb rubber". As of 2015, her list of 200 athletes with cancer contained 150 soccer players, 95 of whom were goalkeepers.

References

External links
 Washington coach profile
 
 

United States women's international soccer players
University of Central Florida alumni
Living people
1991 FIFA Women's World Cup players
UCF Knights women's soccer players
Washington Huskies women's soccer coaches
Soccer players from Washington (state)
People from Federal Way, Washington
American women's soccer players
American soccer coaches
1965 births
FIFA Women's World Cup-winning players
Women's association football goalkeepers
Female sports coaches
New Mexico Lobos women's soccer coaches